Leptodactylus elenae is a species of frogs in the family Leptodactylidae.

It is found in Argentina, Bolivia, Brazil, Paraguay, and possibly Peru.
Its natural habitats are subtropical or tropical dry forests, subtropical or tropical moist lowland forests, moist savanna, subtropical or tropical dry shrubland, subtropical or tropical moist shrubland, intermittent freshwater marshes, pastureland, and heavily degraded former forest.

References

elenae
Amphibians described in 1978
Taxonomy articles created by Polbot